126 may refer to:
126 (number), a natural number
AD 126, a year in the 2nd century AD
126 BC, a year in the 2nd century BC
126 film, a cartridge-based film format used in still photography
126 (New Jersey bus)
126 Artist-run Gallery
Interstate 126 in South Carolina

See also
12/6 (disambiguation)
Unbihexium, a hypothetical chemical element with atomic number 126